Alexandra Narváez Trujillo is an Ecuadorian scientist and Indigenous leader who advocates for the protection of her community's lands and cultures. She is a professor at the School of Biological Sciences at the Pontifical Catholic University of Ecuador (Pontificia Universidad Católica del Ecuador), where she has conducted research on the bioactivity of Ecuadorian fungal endophytes. In addition to her scientific career, Narváez is an Indigenous leader and activist in Ecuador, and has played a crucial role in her community's efforts to defend their rights to land and cultural survival in the Amazon rainforest. She has received numerous awards and honors for her contributions to science and Indigenous activism, including the 2022 Goldman Environmental Prize.

Education 

Narváez received her bachelor's degree in Biological Sciences from the Pontificia Universidad Católica del Ecuador in 1991. She completed her master's degree in the area of plant molecular biology at Oregon State University and later finished her doctoral studies at the University of Montpellier II in France, where she earned a PhD in plant genetic resources.

Career

Scientific career 

Narváez is currently the sub-dean of the faculty of exact and natural sciences at the Pontificia Universidad Católica del Ecuador and a principal investigator at the Center for Research for Health in Latin America (CIseAL). In addition, she is a professor at the School of Biological Sciences at the Pontificia Universidad Católica del Ecuador, where she has been working for over 20 years.

Narváez has published numerous articles in academic journals, including "The domestication of Yuca, and its relationship with a little-known Ecuadorian relative" in Nuestra Ciencia. She has also conducted research on the bioactivity of Ecuadorian fungal endophytes, including the project "Bioactivity screening of the Ecuadorian fungal endophyte collection (CE-QCA)" which evaluated the antifungal, antibacterial, and antiparasitic properties of specific fungal endophytes.

Indigenous activism 
In addition to her scientific career, Narváez is an Indigenous leader and activist in Ecuador. As the first woman Cofán member of Sinangoe's land patrol, she has pushed back against patriarchal structures and worked to promote the leadership of women in the struggle for Indigenous autonomy and the protection of Indigenous lands and cultures. She actively plays a role in her community's efforts to defend their rights to land and cultural survival in the Amazon rainforest.

She was involved in a lawsuit against the Ecuadorian government that resulted in the cancellation of 52 gold mining concessions in 2018, protecting 79,000 acres of biodiverse rainforest and a pristine headwaters region of one of the most important rivers in the Ecuadorian Amazon. This legal victory set a precedent that the Cofán later used to bring a case before Ecuador's Constitutional (Supreme) Court, which in February 2022 ruled in favor of the Cofán people, establishing the nation's first constitutional guarantee for the Indigenous right to "free, prior, and informed consent" over any extractive activities that may impact their lands. This decision protects almost 23 million acres of rainforest in Ecuador from resource extraction.

Awards and recognition 
Narváez has received numerous awards and honors for her contributions to science and Indigenous activism, including the "Premio Mujer y Ciencia" award from the Ecuadorian Association of Women Scientists and Engineers, which recognizes the achievements of women in science and engineering. She has also been recognized by the Ecuadorian government for her contributions to the field of plant molecular biology and her work in promoting scientific research in Ecuador.

In addition, Narváez and her colleague, Alex Lucitante, have been awarded the 2022 Goldman Environmental Prize for their efforts to protect their community's lands from gold mining. This marks the second time that this prize has been awarded to Ecuadoran Indigenous leaders. In 2020, Nemonte Nenquimo, leader of the Waorani, received the same prize for her work in protecting more than 200,000 hectares of the Waorani's Indigenous lands in an area of tropical rainforest that has repeatedly been targeted by the oil industry.

References 

Goldman Environmental Prize awardees
Living people
Women environmentalists
Indigenous rights activists
Indigenous women of the Americas
Ecuadorian environmentalists
Indigenous activists of the Americas
Indigenous peoples and the environment
21st-century women
Year of birth missing (living people)
Oregon State University alumni